Long Island Veterinary Specialists is a veterinary specialty center located in Plainview, Long Island, New York.

History 
LIVS was first located in Levittown, NY and was previously called “Island Veterinary Referral.” Dr. Meyer Kaplan, veterinary surgeon and owner of Levittown Animal Hospital, and Dr. John Sapienza, veterinary ophthalmologist, formed Island Veterinary Referral in 1993. Dr. Dominic J. Marino, veterinary surgeon, and  Dr. Rada Panich, veterinary dermatologist, joined Island Veterinary Referral the same year. In June 1998, Island Veterinary Referral changed their name to Long Island Veterinary Specialists. At the time, LIVS was Long Island's first veterinary specialist center with a CT scanner and a fully equipped emergency and critical care center. The Center at LIVS contains an active Neurology/Neurosurgery department and one of the only “electronic brachytherapy” treatment facility for pet cancer.

Among the noteworthy accomplishments of Long Island Veterinary Specialists is their work with canine Chiari-like malformation and syringomyelia. The clinicians at Long Island Veterinary Specialists have made advances in the diagnosis and medical management of pets with CM as well as other abnormalities of the craniocervical junction. Some of these advances are made possible using MR imaging to evaluate and the development of a thermal camera-based screening test.

Before the introduction of MRI, CM and SM were commonly confused with allergic skin disorders, degenerative disc disease, ear infections and epilepsy. After CM was reported in human patients, the initial research was provided for the diagnosis of animals.

On July 13, 2012, Dr. Dominic J. Marino, Chief of Staff at Long Island Veterinary Specialists was featured in a New York Times feature story for hosting and conducting a two-day combat training course for the Air Force Pararescuers from the USAF (United States Air Force)/NYANG (New York Air National Guard), and their service canines. The training session, spanning two days at the LIVS facility consisted of lectures, demonstration labs, and tactical drills to teach pararescuers how to treat canines in crisis situations.

References

External links 
 

Veterinary hospitals
Veterinary medicine in the United States
Plainview, New York
Buildings and structures in Nassau County, New York